West Argyle Street Historic District (also known as Little Saigon, New Chinatown, and Asia on Argyle) is a historic district in northern Uptown, Chicago, Illinois. It was listed on the National Register of Historic Places on June 3, 2010.

It was home to the Essenay Studios in the 1920s founded by Charlie Chaplin, a producer of silent movies before relocating to Southern California in Hollywood. Essenay Studios now is home to St. Augustine College.

History

Argyle Park
The area covered by the historic district originally developed in the 1880s as a suburb called Argyle Park. The suburb was named by Chicago Alderman and developer James A. Campbell for his ancestors the Dukes of Argyll in Scotland. Development was centered on a station on the new Chicago & Evanston line of the Chicago, Milwaukee and St. Paul Railway that opened in May 1885.

The village, along with the rest of the Lake View Township, was annexed into Chicago in 1889. In 1908 the Northwestern Elevated Railroad was extended north from Wilson Avenue, using the tracks of the Chicago, Milwaukee & St. Paul Railroad, This linked the suburb into Chicago's 'L' network, and the area became popular with people of limited means who wanted to live on the Lake Michigan shore. The railroad tracks were elevated onto an embankment between 1914 and 1922.

New Chinatown

Chicago restaurateur Jimmy Wong bought property in the area in the 1960s and planned its rebirth as New Chinatown. He envisioned a mall with pagodas, trees and reflecting ponds to replace the empty storefronts. The Hip Sing Association, a Chinese cultural group, moved its Chicago offices to Argyle Street in 1971, and by 1974 Wong and the Hip Sing Association owned 80% of the three-block stretch on Argyle. Wong had an accident and broke both hips, leaving him unable to follow through on his plans. In 1979 Charlie Soo, founder of the Asian American Small Business Association, took up the cause, and the area developed not solely as a Chinese enclave but also including Vietnamese, Lao, Cambodian, and Japanese businesses. Soo campaigned to get the Chicago Transit Authority to give the Argyle 'L' station a $250,000 face-lift, then in 1981 he started the "Taste of Argyle," an annual food festival. He also secured funds from Chicago Mayor Jane Byrne to fix the sidewalks, and later from Mayor Harold Washington to repair building facades. Because of his tireless work in promoting the neighborhood, Soo would later be known as the unofficial "Mayor of Argyle Street." By 1986 it was estimated that Uptown had about 8,000 Chinese and Vietnamese residents.

The concentration of Vietnamese restaurants, bakeries and shops; as well as Chinese, Cambodian, Laotian and Thai businesses along Argyle Street, centered on the Argyle 'L' station has led to the neighborhood being nicknamed New Chinatown, Little Saigon, or Little Vietnam. On June 3, 2010 the area roughly bounded by Broadway to the west, Winona Street to the north, Sheridan Road to the east, and Ainslie Street to the south was entered into the National Register of Historic Places.

See also
National Register of Historic Places listings in Chicago

References

External links

Historic districts in Chicago
North Side, Chicago
Neighborhoods in Chicago
Asian-American culture in Chicago
Ethnic enclaves in Illinois
Cambodian-American culture
Chinatowns in the United States
Little Saigons
Laotian-American culture
Thai-American culture
Vietnamese-American history
Buildings and structures on the National Register of Historic Places in Chicago
Populated places established in the 1880s